City of Derry Rugby Football Club is a rugby club, formed in 1881 in Derry, Northern Ireland. They currently play in the Ulster Rugby Championship Division 1 after relegation from Division 2C of the All-Ireland League in 2022. 

The club's purpose-built facility is at Craig Thompson Stadium, situated just outside Strathfoyle. The stadium itself is named after the YouTuber of the same name, known as Mini Ladd, who sponsored the club in November 2017. The sponsorship ended on 1 July 2020 after sexual misconduct allegations toward Thompson.

History
The club was established in 1881, winning the Irish Provincial Towns Cup in the following season.

In December 2001, the club was involved in a controversial appeal, involving a £4,000 fine and the deduction of 8 points after fielding an ineligible player. This resulted in the club being relegated from the AIB Division Two.  In March 2007 the club hosted a youth project that saw 13 different primary schools compete. Following relegation, the club appointed New Zealander Bevan Lynch in June 2008 as head coach. He set about improving the club's fortunes and has introduced a number of new faces. The club were unbeaten in all competitions in the 2008 – 2009 season. In the following 2009–2010 season they won the All Ireland junior Cup, the Ulster Qualifying League and were promoted back into the All Ireland League. The club also has under 19, under 17, under 15 and under 13 teams, a thriving mini and ladies sections

Honours
Ulster Senior Cup: 1
 1999–2000
Ulster Senior League: 1
 1999–2000
Ulster Towns Cup: 12
 1882–83, 1888–89, 1890–91, 1891–92, 1892–93, 1896–97, 1897–98, 1907–08, 1934–35, 1935–36, 2008–09, 2012–13 (Shared with Ballyclare)
Ulster Junior Cup: 3
 1897–98, 1945–46, 2008–09

Notable players

Ireland
The following City of Derry players have represented Ireland at full international level.

Alexander Foster
Noel Henderson
Gerald Glynn Allen
Charles Elliott Allen
Ken Goodall

British and Irish Lions
The following City of Derry players have also represented the British and Irish Lions.

Alexander Foster: 1910
Noel Henderson: 1950
Ken Goodall: 1968

AIB Junior Cup
In January 2010, City of Derry beat Armagh by 2 points to win their first ever AIB Junior Cup title.

References and Footnotes

External links
City of Derry RFC
Summer Rugby Scheme, in association with CODRFC
Information on Napit

Rugby union clubs in Northern Ireland
Rugby clubs established in 1881
Sport in Derry (city)
Senior Irish rugby clubs (Ulster)
1881 establishments in Ireland
Rugby union clubs in County Londonderry
Derry (city)